Sitthichok Tassanai (born 7 June 1991) is a Thai professional footballer who plays as a midfielder for Thai League 1 club Police Tero.

References

External links
 at Soccerway

1991 births
Living people
Sitthichok Tassanai
Sitthichok Tassanai
Sitthichok Tassanai
Sitthichok Tassanai
Association football midfielders
Sitthichok Tassanai